Royal Porthcawl Golf Club is a golf club in Wales in the United Kingdom, located north of Porthcawl and bordering the Bristol Channel. 
 
The club has hosted many prestigious tournaments including The Amateur Championship on six occasions, the Walker Cup in 1995, the Curtis Cup in 1964, the British Masters in 1961, and European Tour event, the Welsh Golf Classic in the early 1980s. In March 2010, it hosted the University Golf Match between Oxford and Cambridge universities, with Oxford winning 9–6. The Senior Open Championship has been played here twice, in 2014 and 2017, and will host again in 2023.

History
The club was founded in 1891 by a group of businessmen from Cardiff, with the first nine-hole golf course being laid out on Lock's Common by Charles Gibson the following year. In 1895, the club moved to its present location with the addition of a further nine-hole course. Shortly after that, the new course was extended to eighteen holes, with the original course later being abandoned. Royal status was conferred on the club by King Edward VII in 1909.

The Senior Open Championship was played at Royal Porthcawl in 2014 and Bernhard Langer won by thirteen strokes over runner-up Colin Montgomerie; it returned again in 2017, where Langer defeated Corey Pavin to win again.

In 2015, The R&A championship committee chairman Peter Unsworth said that The R&A had "no intention" of hosting The Open Championship at Royal Porthcawl. He added that "We're happy with the number of courses on the rota, and we don't have any intention to go to Porthcawl". It is thought that the infrastructure around Royal Porthcawl does not meet requirements, with roads leading to the course being narrow and that public transport would not cope with the huge crowds in the Open Championships.

Major tournaments hosted at Royal Porthcawl

Future events

See also
List of golf clubs granted Royal status

References

External links

Golf clubs and courses in Wales
Walker Cup venues
Curtis Cup venues
Organisations based in Wales with royal patronage
Royal golf clubs